Samuel Frederick Jones (born 15 December 1991) is an English former rugby union player. 

Jones studied at Aylesbury Grammar School and King's College London.

He played rugby for England U-16, U-18 and U-20, and Wasps RFC in the Aviva Premiership.  In 2013 he was called up to the Barbarian's team to play England and the British & Irish Lions.

On 30 September 2016 Jones was called up to the senior England squad by coach Eddie Jones for the Autumn Internationals. However while training with England he suffered multiple leg injuries in a judo session, which ruled him out of the Tests and led to his retirement in March 2018.

References

External links 
ESPN Profile

1991 births
Living people
English rugby union players
Rugby union players from Aylesbury